also titled  is a 2008 Japanese pink film directed by Naoyuki Tomomatsu. Tomomatsu shot the film for the Gensō Haikyū-sha production company, and it was released theatrically in Japan by OP Eiga on September 19, 2008. It was given an Honorable Mention for Best Film at the 2008 Pink Grand Prix ceremony, where lead actress Asami Sugiura was also given one of the Best New Actress Awards.

Synopsis
Prison Girl follows Ayaka, a bored housewife, trapped in a loveless and pointless marriage.  Her imagination, on the other hand, is vibrant. Ayaka has been experiencing the same dream since she was a teenager.  The dream is of her in prison, repeatedly getting molested by the prison guards and warden. The line between fantasy and reality increasingly gets blurred, as Ayaka struggles to make sense of her vivid prison assaults and her deteriorating marriage.

Cast
Asami Sugiura: Ayaka Kaminuma
Hiroshi Fujita: Jail guard 1 / Debt collector 1
Yukiharu Inoue: Jail guard 2 / Debt collector 2
Fumiaki Kato: Lawyer
Yoko Satomi: Misa
Mari Yamaguchi: Woman / Kyoko
Hiroaki Yanagi: Kenji Kaminuma

Availability
The film was released in theaters in Japan on September 19, 2008. In the fall 2014, the independent distributor Pink Eiga, Inc. released the film on DVD along with their other titles Milk the Maid and Educating Yuna.

References

External links
 
 Reviews
 
 

2008 films
BDSM in films
2000s Japanese-language films
Pink films
2000s pornographic films
2000s Japanese films